Boyz n da Hood  is an American Southern gangsta rap group from Atlanta, Georgia. They were formerly signed to Sean Combs' Bad Boy Records and consisted of Young Jeezy, Jody Breeze, Gorilla Zoe, Big Gee, and Big Duke.  They have collaborated several times with fellow Atlanta, Georgia artist and Block Ent labelmate Yung Joc.

Discography

Studio albums

Singles

As a lead artist

References

External links
Boyz n da Hood official website

Jody Breeze explains Jeezy diss track

American hip hop groups
Bad Boy Records artists
Musical groups from Georgia (U.S. state)
Rappers from Atlanta
Southern hip hop groups
African-American musical groups
Gangsta rap groups
Jeezy